Qeysnab (also Romanized as Qeyşnāb and Qeysnāb) is a village in Qurigol Rural District, in the Central District of Bostanabad County, East Azerbaijan Province, Iran. At the 2006 census, its population was 315, in 51 families.

References 

Populated places in Bostanabad County